The United States federal executive departments are the principal units of the executive branch of the federal government of the United States. They are analogous to ministries common in parliamentary or semi-presidential systems but (the United States being a presidential system) they are led by a head of government who is also the head of state. The executive departments are the administrative arms of the President of the United States. There are currently 15 executive departments.

Overview

Structure

Each department is headed by a secretary of their respective department, with the exception of the Department of Justice, whose head is known as the attorney general. The heads of the executive departments are appointed by the president and take office after confirmation by the United States Senate, and serve at the pleasure of the president. The heads of departments are members of the Cabinet of the United States, an executive organ that normally acts as an advisory body to the president. In the Opinion Clause (Article II, section 2, clause 1) of the U.S. Constitution, heads of executive departments are referred to as "principal Officer in each of the executive Departments".

The heads of executive departments are included in the line of succession to the president, in the event of a vacancy in the presidency, after the vice president, the speaker of the House and the president pro tempore of the Senate.

Separation of powers

To enforce a strong separation of powers, the federal Constitution's Ineligibility Clause expressly prohibits executive branch employees (including heads of executive departments) from simultaneously serving in Congress, and vice versa.  Accordingly, in sharp contrast to virtually all other Western democracies (parliamentary systems) where ministers are selected to form a government from members of parliament, American legislators who are appointed by the president and confirmed by the Senate to serve as heads of executive departments must resign from Congress before assuming their new positions.  If the emoluments for a new appointee's executive branch position were increased while the appointee was previously serving in Congress (e.g., cost of living adjustments), the president must implement a Saxbe fix.

Supervisory role

As is evident from the chart below, several executive departments (Education, Health and Human Services, Housing and Urban Development, and Transportation) have disproportionately small employee headcounts in contrast to the size of their budgets.  This is because many of their employees merely supervise contracts with private independent contractors or grants (especially categorical grants) to state or local government agencies who are primarily responsible for providing services directly to the general public. In the 20th century, when the federal government began to provide funding and supervision for matters which were historically seen as the domain of state governments (i.e., education, health and welfare services, housing, and transportation), Congress frequently authorized only funding for grants which were voluntary in the sense that state or local government agencies could choose to apply for such grants (and accept conditions attached by Congress), or they could decline to apply.  In the case of HHS's Medicare program, Congress chose to contract with private health insurers because they "already possessed the requisite expertise for administering complex health insurance programs", and because American hospitals preferred to continue dealing with private insurers instead of a new federal bureaucracy.

Current departments

Former departments

Proposed departments

Department of Industry and Commerce, proposed by Secretary of the Treasury William Windom in a speech given at a Chamber of Commerce dinner in May 1881.
 Department of Natural Resources, proposed by the Eisenhower administration, President Richard Nixon, the 1976 GOP national platform, and by Bill Daley (as a consolidation of the Departments of the Interior and Energy, and the Environmental Protection Agency).
 Department of Peace, proposed by Senator Matthew Neely in the 1930s, Congressman Dennis Kucinich, 2020 presidential candidate Marianne Williamson, and other members of the U.S. Congress.
 Department of Social Welfare, proposed by President Franklin Roosevelt in January 1937.
 Department of Public Works, proposed by President Franklin Roosevelt in January 1937.
 Department of Conservation (renamed Department of the Interior), proposed by President Franklin Roosevelt in January 1937.
 Department of Urban Affairs and Housing, proposed by President John F. Kennedy.
 Department of Business and Labor, proposed by President Lyndon Johnson.
 Department of Community Development, proposed by President Richard Nixon; to be chiefly concerned with rural infrastructure development.
 Department of Human Resources, proposed by President Richard Nixon; essentially a revised Department of Health, Education, and Welfare.
 Department of Economic Affairs, proposed by President Richard Nixon; essentially a consolidation of the Departments of Commerce, Labor, and Agriculture.
 Department of Environmental Protection, proposed by Senator Arlen Specter and others.
 Department of Intelligence, proposed by former Director of National Intelligence Mike McConnell.
 Department of Global Development, proposed by the Center for Global Development.
 Department of Art, proposed by Quincy Jones.
 Department of Business, proposed by President Barack Obama as a consolidation of the U.S. Department of Commerce's core business and trade functions, the Small Business Administration, the Office of the U.S. Trade Representative, the Export-Import Bank, the Overseas Private Investment Corporation, and the U.S. Trade and Development Agency.
Department of Education and the Workforce, proposed by President Donald Trump as a consolidation of the Departments of Education and Labor.
Department of Health and Public Welfare, proposed by President Donald Trump as a renamed Department of Health and Human Services.
Department of Economic Development, proposed by Senator Elizabeth Warren to replace the Commerce Department, subsume other agencies like the Small Business Administration and the Patent and Trademark Office, and include research and development programs, worker training programs, and export and trade authorities like the Office of the U.S. Trade Representative with the single goal of creating and defending good American jobs.
Department of Technology, proposed by businessman and 2020 Democratic presidential Candidate Andrew Yang.
Department of Children and Youth, proposed by Marianne Williamson.
Department of Culture, patterned on similar departments in many foreign nations, proposed by, among others, Murray Moss and Jeva Lange.

See also 
 Independent agencies of the United States government
 List of federal agencies in the United States
 Canadian Federal government departments
 British government departments
 Cabinet of the Confederate States of America

References

Citations

Sources 

 Relyea, Harold C. "Homeland Security: Department Organization and Management" (PDF), Report for Congress, 2002. RL31493 (August 7, 2002).

External links